The 1956-57 Botola is the first season of the Moroccan Premier League. Wydad Casablanca are the holders of the title.

References
Morocco 1956/57

Botola seasons
Morocco
Botola